George "Geordie" Beamish (born 24 October 1996) is a New Zealand long-distance runner. He won the 3000m at the 2022 Millrose Games in a time of 7:39.50, setting a national record, which he lowered to 7:36.22 at the same event in 2023 when finishing sixth. This time is also superior to the New Zealand outdoor record of 7:36.91 held by Nick Willis. Beamish also holds the New Zealand indoor 5000m record, in a time of 13:12.53 which he ran on 4 December 2021.

College career

In 2016 George Beamish debuted for Northern Arizona University ending his cross-country season with a ninth-place at Big Sky Championships, finished 97th at NCAA Nationals. Competing in four indoor meets, setting a personal best in the mile in 4:07.59 at the Iowa State classic. He competed in five outdoor events, opening the outdoor season with PR in the 5K (13:53.59), competing in Big Sky Championships (5000m) and NCAA West Prelims (1500m) setting career-best in the 1500m event at Bryan Clay (3:41.87).

In 2017 he competed in cross country, earning All American honors in the national meet. Competing in three indoor events, setting career-best time in the 3000-meter event at Iowa State Classic (8:10.06). During his only outdoor race of the year (after suffering injury) he finished 13th over 5000m in 13:55.65 at the Stanford Invitational.

In 2018 he set a new PR in the 8K after placing fourth at Big Sky Championships (23:29.2). He placed 14th at the Nuttycombe Wisconsin Invitational, helping NAU take first as a team at that event. He then took a 25th-place finish at Wisconsin Pre-Nationals. Finishing the season, he earned All-American status and set a new PR after placing 39th in the men's 10K race at NCAA National Championships (29:58.4).
In 2019 indoors, he won the NCAA men's mile in a time of 4:07.69. In the outdoors he Set a PR in the Men's 1500m Run at the Payton Jordan Invite with a time of 13:31.58. He was the 2019 Big Sky Conference Indoor Men's Mile Champion with a time of 4:10.90. He placed 10th in the Men's 5000m race at NCAA Division I Outdoor Championships with a time of 14:13.18.

In 2019, he won the NCAA D1 mountain region championship (30:35.6) and finished 37th at the NCAA D1 national meet.

Pro career
Beamish joined On Athletics Club in 2020 alongside Joe Klecker and Ollie Hoare coached by Dathan Ritzenhein. Spending the first year of his professional career injured, he raced twice in 2021 indoors running national records for New Zealand in the 5000m (13:12.53) and 3000m (7:39.50).

Personal life
Born to Simon and Josi Beamish, three siblings, Hugo, Lucinda, and Eve Beamish.

References

External links
 
 

1996 births
Living people
New Zealand male long-distance runners
Commonwealth Games competitors for New Zealand
Athletes (track and field) at the 2022 Commonwealth Games
Northern Arizona Lumberjacks men's track and field athletes
Northern Arizona Lumberjacks men's cross country runners
20th-century New Zealand people
21st-century New Zealand people
Place of birth missing (living people)